The Office for Health Improvement and Disparities (OHID) is a government unit within the British Department of Health and Social Care that leads national efforts to improve public health policy across England.

The body is a successor organisation to Public Health England, and is responsible for health improvement and public health functions along with NHS England, as outlined in correspondence on the location of Public Health England functions from 1 October 2021. The Office focuses on reducing the burdens of preventable illness and disease, and of health inequalities, on society and the healthcare system. It explores how incentives and rewards can encourage healthier behaviour, with an explicit focus on the work of the Health Promotion Board in Singapore.

The OHID became fully operational on 1 October 2021.

See also
 Health in the United Kingdom
 List of national public health agencies

References

2021 establishments in England
Government agencies established in 2021
Organisations based in the London Borough of Lambeth
National public health agencies
Health in England